Nedumbassery, is a suburb of the city of Kochi in Kerala, India.

Location

Nedumbassery lies between the two municipalities of Aluva and Angamaly in the Greater Cochin region. It had a population of 28,607 as of 2001, with a sex-ratio of 1012 females to 1000 males. There were 6721 households in the village.

Cochin International Airport

Cochin International Airport is located in Nedumbassery. It also houses the airport's solar plant, making it the first fully solar powered airport in India.  A small hamlet, this village has enough water resources to meet the demands of its increasing populace. The manner in which the local authorities tend to water bodies in the area helped to eliminate water shortages even during acute summers.

History
Legend says that Nedumbassery is named after a poor heart broken backward caste man called Nedumban Pulayan who arrived there as a refuge and the local chieftain gave him vast land as a gift out of sympathy. Ever since, the land is known after him as Nedumbassery. This legend, though is not verified by any direct proof.

Economy
Recently there has been demand for the land in and around Nedumbassery and the property prices have been trending upwards. There has also been a proposal for a railway station at Nedumbassery. The traditional land owners have sold many of their lands to new buyers with the arrival of the new airport, at high prices.

The rice paddy fields in and around Nedumbassery were once a granary to the people of Kerala and a Japanese delegation has conducted a study on the paddy fields of Nedumbassery. The paddy fields are fertile because they are close to Periyar river and its branches which fertile the land with abundant crops.

Nedumbassery is also the home town of Jacobite Syrian Bishop late 'Gewargis Mor Gregorios, BA, LT of Vayaliparambil Pynadath family(1899–1966),
a leader, agriculturist and an educationalist who managed "High school to an Engineering college" (1960s) and started a silent educational revolution in India as early as 1939 in pre-independent British India. HG.Mor Gregorios Vayaliparambil was the first Chairman of Mor Athanasious College Association, Kothamangalam.

Education
An English High school was built at Nedumbassery in 1939 by Jacobite Syrian Bishop H.E. Mor Gregorios Vayaliparambil (also the first chairman of Mor Athanasious College Association, Kothamangalam) and was known as 'Mor Athanasious High School'. This school provided education to all people in the nearby areas including Angamali, Perumbavur. The school has been a source of education to all classes of people and has produced many IAS officers and top bureaucrats for India. In 1949 Mor Gregorios Vayaliparambil Pynadath constructed a new church in Nedumbassery, opposite his school known as St.George Jacobite Syrian Church.

Churches
On the way to Cochin International airport is the Mor Sabor and Afroth Jacobite Syrian Orthodox Cathedral built in 825 AD and named after two Syrian Orthodox bishops who arrived India in 825 AD, Mor Sabor and Mor Afroth. The Patriarchs of Antioch who visited India have visited this ancient cathedral in Nedumbassery starting with HH.Patriarch Ignatious Peter IV of Antioch in 1876. Malankara Metropolitan Bishop St. Athanasius Paulose Pynadath (1918–53) of Jacobite Syrian Orthodox Church frequently visited Mor Sabor and Mor Afroth Jacobite Church in Nedumbassery as it was his home parish. This church was a decision making centre of Jacobite Syrian Church of India as all Indian bishops and middle East Syriac bishops routinely visited here.

Economy
There was a manufacturing unit built using Japanese collaboration functioning here for very few years at end of 1960s called 'Toshiba Anand' which was locked out. A state-owned heavy agro machinery industry called 'KAMCO' (Kerala Agro Machinery Corporation Ltd) is also functioning here. The Japanese delegation of agricultural scientist had conducted study of paddy cultivation in Nedumbassery in a joint venture with Government of India in the 1960s. Nedumbassery is known for rice cultivation and large paddy fields.

There is a Panchayat office and post office at Kariyad in Nedumbassery.

Kochi/Cochin International Airport

Cochin International Airport is the first airport in India with private participation. It is known as CIAL (Cochin International Airport Limited) which is a public limited company. This is one of the busiest airports in the country and the largest and most preferred for visiting Kerala State or Kochi/Cochin. The entire airport was built by filling vast paddy fields with special government permission.

A new approach road has been built exclusively from the National Highway to the airport and new hotels have come up on the sides on the new road with a bridge above the railway underpass. Most of the land are paddy fields which are not permitted for any development. The paddy fields of Nedumbassery were selected for study by Government of India for the Japanese delegation who conducted study of paddy cultivation at Nedumbassery in the 1960s. The Japanese agricultural scientist recorded in detail the cultivation techniques of the people in Nedumbassery for their research.

References

External links

  From Antioch to Athani (Nedumbassery) published by New Indian Express, India
 Cochin International Airport, Nedumbassery, Kerala, India
 St. George's Jacobite Syrian Orthodox Church, Nedumbassery, Kerala, India
 

Cities and towns in Ernakulam district
Suburbs of Kochi